Feydhoo (Dhivehi: ފޭދޫ) is one of the inhabited islands of the Addu Atoll (formerly known as Seenu Atoll).

The people of Feydhoo are former residents of Gan. Gan was a very fertile island with its coconut palms, breadfruit trees, yam, binbi and numerous other types of trees flourishing. Even during the Second World War, the people of Gan were economically self-sufficient. However, in 1956/1957 they had to leave their livelihood they had been enjoying for so long, forever because the British Royal Air Force leased the island to build RAF Gan, a military base on the island. All the residents were moved to the next island west of Gan, Feydhoo, a less fertile and much smaller island whose own residents were moved to the eastern side of Maradhoo.

In 2013, the districts of Feydhoo and Maradhoo-Feydhoo were united to one district.

Geography
It is the southernmost inhabited island of Maldives.

Demography

References

External links
 Official City link

Islands of the Maldives